Thumlock were a stoner rock band from Wollongong. The band's name was derived from combining the words thumbscrews and hemlock. They formed in 1994 as a three piece by Ben Lough (guitar/vocals), Greg Eshman (drums) and Wayne Stokes (bass). The band released Dripping Silver Heat and then expanded with the addition of Raff Iacurto (guitar). The band signed with High Beam Music and released an EP, Lunar Mountain Sunrise, and two full length albums, Emerald Liquid Odyssey and Sojourns Lucid Magic, and broke up in 2002

Emerald Liquid Odyssey reached #4 on the Australian Independent Record chart  and was distributed by Beard of Stars in Europe. Their next album Sojourns Lucid Magic was distributed in Europe by Cargo Records.

Thumlock have been likened to ""Masters of Reality" or "Paranoid" period Black Sabbath""

After Thumlock Lough, Iacurto, Stokes and Kane Goodwin formed another band called  Remnants Of A Dead Star (R.O.A.D.S.) which released one ep Double White Lines. Stokes was a member of The Wardens and Leadfinger.

Discography
EPs
 Dripping Silver Heat (1997)
 Lunar Mountain Sunrise (1999) - High Beam Music

Albums
 Emerald Liquid Odyssey (2000) - High Beam Music
 Sojourns Lucid Magic (2002) - High Beam Music

Singles
 "Moon Dragon" (2001) - High Beam Music
 "Rockin' Course" (2001) - High Beam Music
 "Modulator" (2002) - High Beam Music

References

External links
Monolith Emerald Liquid Odyssey review
Hellride Music Liquid Emerald Odyssey (sic) review
Hellride Music Lunar Mountain Sunrise review

New South Wales musical groups